Selachinematidae is a family of nematodes belonging to the order Desmodorida.

Genera:
 Bendiella Leduc, 2013
 Cheironchus Cobb, 1917
 Demonema Cobb, 1894
 Desmotersia Neira & Decraemer, 2009
 Kosswigonema Gerlach, 1964
 Pseudocheironchus Leduc, 2013
 Synonchiella Cobb, 1933
 Synonchium Cobb, 1920
 Trogolaimus

References

Nematodes